Vallgorguina is a municipality in the comarca of Vallès Oriental in Catalonia, Spain. It is situated in the hollow between the ranges of el Corredor and Montnegre. It is linked to Sant Celoni and to Arenys de Munt by a local road.

The GR 92 long distance footpath, which roughly follows the length of the Mediterranean coast of Spain, has a staging point at Vallgorguina.

Demography

References

 Panareda Clopés, Josep Maria; Rios Calvet, Jaume; Rabella Vives, Josep Maria (1989). Guia de Catalunya, Barcelona: Caixa de Catalunya.  (Spanish).  (Catalan).

External links
Official website 
 Government data pages 

Municipalities in Vallès Oriental